When They Cry is a Japanese media franchise consisting of visual novel games and adaptations thereof, and may refer to:

 Higurashi When They Cry
 Umineko When They Cry
 Ciconia When They Cry

Higurashi When They Cry